Kellow House is a historic building located in Cresco, Iowa, United States. Kellow was a native of Cornwall in England who settled in Iowa in 1854. He established his own grocery and merchandise firm, and had this house built in 1880 for his new wife and future family.  The two-story, red brick house was designed in the Second Empire style. It features three porches and is capped with a mansard roof. The house basically follows a rectangular plan, with a pavilion that slightly protrudes from the east side. It was acquired by the Howard County Historical Society in 1969, and now houses a museum and a resource center for the historical society. The house was listed on the National Register of Historic Places in 1977.

References

Houses completed in 1880
Second Empire architecture in Iowa
Houses on the National Register of Historic Places in Iowa
Museums in Howard County, Iowa
Historic house museums in Iowa
National Register of Historic Places in Howard County, Iowa